Steve Khan (born Steven Harris Cahn;
April 28, 1947) is an American jazz guitarist.

Career
Steven Harris Cahn was born in Los Angeles. His father, lyricist Sammy Cahn, "loved to hear any and all versions of his songs". He took piano lessons as a child and played drums for the surf rock band the Chantays. The band's guitarist exposed him to the albums Tough Talk by The Crusaders and Movin' Wes by Wes Montgomery. In his late teens he quit the drums and started playing guitar. He was a member of the R&B band Friends of Distinction, recorded with keyboardist Phil Moore, then played on the album Bullitt by Wilton Felder ("one of my heroes"). Despite his father's advice to avoid a career in the music business, he graduated from UCLA with a degree in music composition and theory.

In the early 1970s, he performed in an acoustic guitar duo with Larry Coryell and was a member of the Brecker Brothers band. As a session musician, he appeared on albums by Ashford & Simpson, Rupert Holmes, Billy Joel, and Steely Dan. He was signed to Columbia Records through the efforts of Bobby Colomby and Bob James. On his first three albums Tightrope (1977), The Blue Man (1978), and Arrows (1979), he was trying "to single-handledly keep alive the sound of the original Brecker Brothers band." His next album was Evidence (1980), which contained an eighteen-minute medley of songs by Thelonious Monk.

He has also produced recordings for fellow guitarists Larry Coryell, Mike Stern, Biréli Lagrène, and Bill Connors, as well as pianist Eliane Elias.

Awards and honors
 Grammy Award nomination, Local Color (1987)
 Grammy Award nomination, Borrowed Time (2007)
 Named to list of "22 All-Time Greatest Jazz Guitarists", Jazz Life magazine (1998)

Discography

As leader

As sideman

Books
 Pentatonic Khancepts (Alfred Music, 2002)
 Contemporary Chord Khancepts (Alfred Music, 1996)
 Wes Montgomery Guitar Folio (Jamey Aebersold, 1973)
 Pat Martino: The Early Years (Alfred Music, 1991)

References

External links
Official website

1947 births
Living people
20th-century American guitarists
21st-century American guitarists
American jazz guitarists
Columbia Records artists
Antilles Records artists
Novus Records artists
American session musicians
Musicians from New York City
Lead guitarists
Guitarists from Los Angeles
Jewish jazz musicians
Jewish American musicians
Jazz musicians from New York (state)
Jazz musicians from California
Steps Ahead members
GRP Records artists
21st-century American Jews